Taq-e Shirin and Farhad is a rock relief from the era of the Sassanid Empire, the Iranian dynasty ruling from 226 to 650 AD. It is located on the way from Zarneh in Ilam Province to Sumar in Kermanshah Province of Iran, seven kilometers from Chel Zarie village near Kooshk Pass in Eyvan County.

The relief is attributed to the lovers Shirin and Farhad during the reign of the Sassanid king Khosrau II (591-628 CE). It was discovered in the year 2000.

See also
Taq Wa San
Taq-i Kisra
Taq-e Gara
Sumar District
Kalhor

References

Persian art
Sasanian architecture
Sculpture of the Ancient Near East
Tourist attractions in Ilam Province
Rock reliefs in Iran